Aridisols (or desert soils) are a soil order in USDA soil taxonomy. Aridisols (from the Latin aridus, for "dry", and solum) form in an arid or semi-arid climate.  Aridisols dominate the deserts and xeric shrublands, which occupy about one third of the Earth's land surface. Aridisols have a very low concentration of organic matter, reflecting the paucity of vegetative production on these dry soils.  
Water deficiency is the major defining characteristic of Aridisols. Also required is sufficient age to exhibit subsoil weathering and development. Limited leaching in aridisols often results in one or more subsurface soil horizons in which suspended or dissolved minerals have been deposited: silicate clays, sodium, calcium carbonate, gypsum or soluble salts. These subsoil horizons can also be cemented by carbonates, gypsum or silica. Accumulation of salts on the surface can result in salinization.

In the World Reference Base for Soil Resources (WRB), most Aridisols belong to the Calcisols, Gypsisols, Durisols and Solonchaks.

See also
 Desert ecology
 Pedogenesis
 Pedology
 Soil classification
 Soil science
 Soil type

References 

 
 

Pedology
Types of soil